The Arrondissement of Bellac is an arrondissement of France in the Haute-Vienne department in the Nouvelle-Aquitaine region. It has 57 communes.

Composition

The communes of the arrondissement of Bellac, and their INSEE codes, are:
 
 Arnac-la-Poste (87003)
 Azat-le-Ris (87006)
 Balledent (87007)
 La Bazeuge (87008)
 Bellac (87011)
 Berneuil (87012)
 Bessines-sur-Gartempe (87014)
 Blanzac (87017)
 Blond (87018)
 Breuilaufa (87022)
 Le Buis (87023)
 Chamboret (87033)
 Châteauponsac (87041)
 Cieux (87045)
 Compreignac (87047)
 La Croix-sur-Gartempe (87052)
 Cromac (87053)
 Dinsac (87056)
 Dompierre-les-Églises (87057)
 Le Dorat (87059)
 Droux (87061)
 Folles (87067)
 Fromental (87068)
 Gajoubert (87069)
 Les Grands-Chézeaux (87074)
 Jouac (87080)
 Lussac-les-Églises (87087)
 Magnac-Laval (87089)
 Mailhac-sur-Benaize (87090)
 Montrol-Sénard (87100)
 Mortemart (87101)
 Nantiat (87103)
 Nouic (87108)
 Oradour-Saint-Genest (87109)
 Peyrat-de-Bellac (87116)
 Rancon (87121)
 Razès (87122)
 Saint-Amand-Magnazeix (87133)
 Saint-Bonnet-de-Bellac (87139)
 Saint-Georges-les-Landes (87145)
 Saint-Hilaire-la-Treille (87149)
 Saint-Junien-les-Combes (87155)
 Saint-Léger-Magnazeix (87160)
 Saint-Martial-sur-Isop (87163)
 Saint-Martin-le-Mault (87165)
 Saint-Ouen-sur-Gartempe (87172)
 Saint-Pardoux-le-Lac (87128)
 Saint-Sornin-la-Marche (87179)
 Saint-Sornin-Leulac (87180)
 Saint-Sulpice-les-Feuilles (87182)
 Tersannes (87195)
 Thouron (87197)
 Val-d'Issoire (87097)
 Val-d'Oire-et-Gartempe (87028)
 Vaulry (87198)
 Verneuil-Moustiers (87200)
 Villefavard (87206)

History

The arrondissement of Bellac was created in 1800.

As a result of the reorganisation of the cantons of France which came into effect in 2015, the borders of the cantons are no longer related to the borders of the arrondissements. The cantons of the arrondissement of Bellac were, as of January 2015:

 Bellac
 Bessines-sur-Gartempe
 Châteauponsac
 Le Dorat
 Magnac-Laval
 Mézières-sur-Issoire
 Nantiat
 Saint-Sulpice-les-Feuilles

Gallery

References

Bellac